The City of Traralgon was a local government area about  east-southeast of Melbourne, the state capital of Victoria, Australia, in the Latrobe Valley region.

History

From 1879 until 1961, Traralgon was part of the shire which surrounded it. On 31 May 1961, it was incorporated as a borough, and on 2 April 1964, it was proclaimed a city.

On 2 December 1994, the City of Traralgon was abolished, and along with the Cities of Moe and Morwell, the Shire of Traralgon, and parts of the Shires of Narracan and Rosedale, was merged into the newly created Shire of La Trobe.

Wards
The City of Traralgon was unsubdivided, and its twelve councillors represented the entire city.

Population

* Estimate in the 1958 Victorian Year Book.

References

External links
 Victorian Places - Traralgon

Traralgon City